Vandamia is a genus of moths of the family Nolidae. The genus was erected by Georges van Son in 1933.

Species
 Vandamia illaudata D. S. Fletcher, 1958
 Vandamia lightfooti (van Son, 1933)
 Vandamia mariepi van Son, 1933
 Vandamia typica van Son, 1933

References

Nolinae